Pastan Kangri is a mountain peak located at  above sea level in the Indian territory of Ladakh, far west of the Transhimalaya.

Location 

The peak is located in the south of Thasa Glacier and south-west of Thusa Kangri.

References 

Mountains of the Transhimalayas
Six-thousanders of the Transhimalayas
Mountains of Ladakh